River Wolf is a river in Devon, England.

River Wolf may also refer to:

Giant otter (Pteronura brasiliensis), also known as the river wolf
A number of rivers called Wolf River

See also
Mackenzie River wolf